Kilverstone Hall is a Grade II listed building in Kilverstone in Norfolk, England.

History
Kilverstone Hall is a country house built in the early 17th century which was passed down the Wright family of Kilverstone. Upon Vavasseur's death in 1908 the house and park were inherited by Cecil Fisher, son of Admiral Lord Fisher and adopted heir to Vavasseur. Admiral Fisher and his wife moved into the Hall by invitation of Cecil Fisher upon the Admiral's retirement as First Sea Lord in 1910 and lived there until he was recalled as First Sea Lord upon the outbreak of World War I in 1914. Lord Fisher's grave is in Kilverstone churchyard. The house was remodelled in a Jacobean style in 1913. It still remains the property of the Fisher family and has the mailed fist and trident of Lord Fisher's baronial crest on its gateposts.

The house is listed Grade II on the National Heritage List for England. The Kilverstone Club in the grounds of the house is Grade II listed, as is the water tower, entrance lodge, stable block, and the base of a Medieval cross near the hall.

The Wrights
The perhaps most famous of the Wrights of Kilverstone was Thomas Wright of Kilverstone, who married Jane Jermyn. Of their children:

 Thomas Wright, Esq., of Kilverstone and Weeting, the heir, entered Lincolns Inn on 5 June 1624.
 John Wright of West Lexham and Ovington, Norfolk, 2nd son, entered  Lincolns Inn on 5 June 1624.
 Jermyn Wright (b.1608) of Wangford in Suffolk, 3rd son, entered Lincolns Inn on 27 November 1626, the father of Sir Robert Wright, Chief Justice of the King's Bench
 Anne, m. to William Stebbing, Esq.
 Sarah, m. to James Ward, Esq. of Hindringham, son and heir of Hamond Warde of Letheringsett, gentleman, at Kilverstone on 8 August 1626. Their marriage settlement is dated 20 July the same year. In 1695, a James Ward, Gent. of Hindringham, was lord of Great Snoring. He gave it with Thursford-Schelton's to Mr. Nun of Thorpland, who held it in 1715. In about 1570 Nover's Manor in Hindringham was conveyed to Martin Hastings, who sold it to Giles Mabbs, or Nabbs, gentleman. He left two daughters and coheirs; Mary, married to Riches Brown, Esq. of Fulmodeston, and another daughter whose first name is unknown, married to a James Ward, gentleman of Hindringham.

References

Breckland District
Country houses in Norfolk
Grade II listed buildings in Norfolk
Grade II listed houses
Jacobethan architecture